This list of museums in Arkansas is a list of museums, defined for this context as institutions (including nonprofit organizations, government entities, and private businesses) that collect and care for objects of cultural, artistic, scientific, or historical interest and make their collections or related exhibits available for public viewing. Museums that exist only in cyberspace (i.e., virtual museums) are not included.

Museums

Defunct museums
 The Band Museum, Pine Bluff, closed in 2010, former website
 Baxter County Heritage Museum, Gassville, closed in 2008 and sold to a private individual
 Gallery Mint Museum, Eureka Springs
 Marine Corps Legacy Museum, Harrison, closed in 2010
 Museum of Chicot County Arkansas, Lake Village, closed in 2014
 Museum of Earth History, Eureka Springs, moved to Dallas, Texas

See also
List of nature centers in Arkansas

Regions of Arkansas
Arkansas Delta - eastern and southeastern sections of the state 
Arkansas River Valley Region
Arkansas Timberlands - also called Southern Arkansas, Southwestern Arkansas or West Gulf Coastal Plain
Little Rock Central Area - Pulaski, Faulkner, Saline, Lonoke, Perry and Grant County
Ouachita Mountains - area around the mountain range located in west central Arkansas
The Ozarks - highland region of northwest and north central Arkansas

References

External links
Arkansas Museum Index
Encyclopedia of Arkansas History & Culture
Arkansas State Parks: History & Heritage

Arkansas
Museums
Museums